The European Open Water Swimming Championships are an event organized by LEN (Ligue Européenne de Natation), dedicated to open water swimming competitions. The event was held biennially from 1989 to 1993; since 1995 the open water swimming has been included in the program of the European Swimming Championships.

Editions
Ten editions was part of the European Aquatics Championships, and seven edition was stand alone editions.

Medal table
Update to 2018 European Aquatics Championships.

See also
 LEN European Aquatics Championships
 List of medalists at the European Open Water Swimming Championships

References

External links
 Ligue Européenne de Natation LEN Official Website
 Open water swimming - All Medallists – Olympic Games, World and European Championships

 
Open water
Open water swimming competitions
Recurring sporting events established in 1989
European Open Water Swimming Championships